The Austrian Air Force is a component part of the Austrian Armed Forces.

History

The Austrian Air Force in its current form was created in May 1955 by the victorious Allied powers, subject to restrictions on its use of guided missiles. The Austrian State Treaty of 1955 committed Austria to permanent neutrality.

Pilot training started out with a four Yak-11 Moose and four Yak-18 Max aircraft donated by the Soviet Union, and Austria purchased further light trainer types under the Military Assistance Program. Until 1960 Austria purchased training and support aircraft under the MAP, but no modern fighter aircraft; the role of a fighter was rather inadequately filled by the already outdated, 30 Saab 29 Tunnan bought second-hand from the Swedish Air Force in the early 1960s.

From 1970, Austria purchased a total of 40 Saab 105 lightweight multi-role aircraft with the intention to deploy them in trainer, reconnaissance, interception and ground attack roles. As it became clear in the 1980s that the sub-sonic aircraft were inadequate for air combat and airspace interdiction, Austria purchased 28 reconditioned Saab 35 Draken fighter aircraft to supersede the Saab 105 as the Austrian Air Force's main interceptor in 1988. The Saab 105 remained in service as a trainer/surveillance aircraft.

Shortly after, the Draken saw their first major use in airspace interdiction starting 1991 during the Yugoslav Wars, when Yugoslav MiG-21 fighters crossed the Austrian border without permission. In one incident on 28 June a MiG-21 penetrated as far as Graz, causing widespread demands for action. Following repeated border crossings by armed aircraft of the Yugoslav People's Army, changes were suggested to the standing orders for aircraft armament.

Since 1955, Austria's armed forces had been forbidden to operate any guided missile system, including air-to-air missiles and surface-to-air missiles (SAMs). In the post-Cold War environment, and with gun-armed aircraft a relic of a past age, the Austrian Parliament voted to amend this section of its state treaty and in January 1993 modern AIM-9 Sidewinder missiles were ordered from Sweden to arm its fighter aircraft. A higher performance model of the Sidewinder was purchased directly from the United States; deliveries began in 1995. French Mistral SAMs were purchased to add ground-based protection against air attack. The first Mistrals arrived in 1993 and final deliveries were concluded in 1996.

The helicopter fleet includes Agusta-Bell (AB) 204s (mainly used for medical evacuation), AB-206s (training and liaison), and AB-212s (used by air-mobile troops and for light transport). 28 French-made Alouette IIIs are available for search-and-rescue tasks, including high mountain operations. The 12 Bell OH-58 Kiowa, a scout helicopter, is mounted with a rapid-firing machine gun, but the air force lacks a true attack helicopter. Most of the helicopters, except the 24 AB-212s, are becoming obsolete. After the 1999 Galtür Avalanche, it became apparent that the Austrian Air Force's helicopter complement were too few in numbers and too limited in design. Therefore, 9 US-built UH-60 Blackhawk helicopters were purchased, to be used for transportation during disasters.

In 2003 Austria's transport capability was improved when it purchased three C-130 Hercules from the Royal Air Force. These aircraft were needed for the demanding UN peacekeeping missions in which Austria played a role.

In 2005, the Saab Draken fleet was retired (50 years after the type first flew), to be replaced by the Eurofighter Typhoon. Before the first delivery of Typhoons, 12 F-5 Tiger II were leased from Switzerland as a stopgap measure. The Eurofighter purchase was subject to controversy in Austria, and became a political football for some time, but the 15th and final aircraft was delivered on 24 September 2009. As of 2017, possible corruption affairs surrounding the Eurofighter procurement are still being investigated by the Austrian parliament. In July 2017, as a result of the ongoing controversy, the Austrian Ministry of Defense announced the phasing out of the Typhoon starting 2020, and its replacement by a "militarily more effective and more cost-efficient" air surveillance system.

Organization

Austria's air force is divided into two brigade-level formations: the Air Surveillance Command in Salzburg tasked with the defense of the Austrian airspace and the Air Support Command in Hörsching Air Base with helicopters and transport planes.

 Air Surveillance Command, Salzburg
 Airspace Surveillance Wing, Zeltweg Air Base
 Fighter Squadron 1, (Eurofighter Typhoon jets)
 Fighter Squadron 2, (Eurofighter Typhoon jets)
 Radar Battalion, Salzburg
 Air Defense Battalion 2, Zeltweg
 Maintenance Facility 2, Zeltweg Air Base
 Air Support Command, Hörsching Air Base
 Air Support Wing, Langenlebarn Air Base
 Medium Transport Helicopter Squadron, (9x S-70A-42 Black Hawk helicopters)
 Light Utility Helicopter Squadron, (11x OH-58B Kiowa helicopters)
 Light Air Transport Squadron, (8x PC-6 Porter planes)
 Air Reconnaissance Squadron, (various drones)
 Liaison Helicopter Squadron, Aigen im Ennstal (16x Alouette III helicopters)
 Light Transport Helicopter Squadron 1, Hörsching Air Base (12x AB 212 helicopters)
 Light Transport Helicopter Squadron 2, Hörsching Air Base (11x AB 212 helicopters)
 Air Transport Squadron, Hörsching Air Base (3x C-130K Hercules planes)
 Maintenance Facility 1, Langenlebarn Air Base
 Maintenance Facility 3, Hörsching Air Base

All personnel destined to enter service with the Air Force is trained by the Air and Air Defense Personnel School based at Langenlebarn Air Base. The school is under direct command and control of the Ministry of Defense and controls two flying units:

 Airplane Training Squadron, Zeltweg Air Base (12x PC-7 planes)
 Helicopter Training Squadron, Langenlebarn Air Base (8x Alouette III helicopters)
After 50 years of service the Austrian Air Force has retired without replacement its Saab 105OE aircraft in January 2021 and has disbanded its Jet Trainer Squadron at Linz - Hörsching Air Base, which has operated the type. The Squadron's younger pilots will re-qualify for the Eurofighter, the older pilots and the aircraft technicians will re-qualify for the AB 212 helicopters and advanced jet flying training will be outsourced to the Italian Air Force's MB.339 and T.346 jet trainers operating from Lecce - Galatina and Decimomannu.

Air Force Locations

Air Bases
Eight air bases are maintained by the Austrian Air Force.

Vogler Air Base

Vogler Air Base, north of the town of Hörsching west of Linz, was built as a base for the German Luftwaffe 1938–1940. After the war the USAAF used the base, then named "Camp McCauley – Hörsching" and housing displaced persons, until 1955 when it was returned to the Austrian government.

Initially used exclusively by the ground forces, the first military aircraft, Yak-18 "Max-A", arrived in 1957. The base was named for First Lieutenant Walter Vogler in 1967.

The German-built base structures were used jointly by the military and civilian aviation until the 70s when construction of the new civilian area in the northern part of the base was finished.

It houses  3, responsible for overhauls and maintenance of the C-130K Hercules and AB-212.

Units currently based here are the C-130K Hercules of 4th Air Transport Squadron, Flight Regiment 3; and the AB-212 of 1st and 2nd Helicopter Squadron, Flight Regiment 3.

Brumowski Air Base

Fliegerhorst Brumowski, south of the town of Langenlebarn northwest of Vienna, was built as a base for the Luftwaffe 1938–1940. After the war the base was briefly occupied by Soviet troops before it was taken over by the USAAF, becoming "Air Force Station Tulln – Vienna". In 1946 Pan Am added the base as a destination, and for a short time there were regular flights New York City/Langenlebarn.

The first Austrian aircraft to arrive were Yak-11 "Moose" and Yak-18 "Max-A" trainers donated by the Soviet Union and Agusta Bell AB47G2 helicopters in late 1955. The base was named for Captain Godwin Brumowski in 1967.

Hinterstoisser Air Base
Fliegerhorst Hinterstoisser, located north of Zeltweg in a region known as Aichfeld, was built as a base for the Air Force of the  1936–1938. The base was occupied by Soviet troops in the aftermath of the war, but then transferred to the RAF which used the base until 1947.

In spring 1957 the first aircraft, Piper PA-18/95 Super Cub and Zlin Z-126 Trener, arrived with  1 at the base. Since then it is the main base for the training of new aviators. It was named for Colonel Franz Hinterstoisser in 1967.

With the retirement of the Saab 35 Draken in 2005 the unit now uses the Eurofighter Typhoon. The first Eurofighter Typhoon arrived in July 2007. The base also houses parts of  2, responsible for overhauls and maintenance of the Saab 105Oe and the Pilatus PC-7 Turbo Trainer, as well as flight school for basic training.

Units currently based here are the PC-7 Turbo Trainer of flight school; detachments of 2nd Squadron and the Eurofighter Typhoon.

Fiala-Fernbrugg Air Base
Fiala-Fernbrugg Air Base, located north of the town of Aigen im Ennstal on the southern edge of the Totes Gebirge, was built as a base for the Air Force of the  1936–37. At the end of World War II the base became the home base of the only helicopter unit of the Luftwaffe; beginning the tradition of helicopter operations at Aigen im Ennstal.

Soviet troops occupied the base after the war, but after only a few weeks control switched to US forces. After a few more weeks, the base ended up in British hands. The RAF rebuilt the base and handed it over to Austria in 1947. It was used as a storage depot for the B-Gendarmerie, a paramilitary police force in the western zones.
After some years of hiatus, the first helicopters, Bell H-13H Sioux arrived in late 1960. The base was named for Captain Benno Fiala von Fernbrugg in 1967.

The base houses , responsible for overhauls and maintenance on the AS-316B Alouette III.  (Alpine landing courses) are conducted at least annually at the base, with officers of foreign air forces as regular attendants.

Units based here are the AS-316B Alouette III of 1st and 2nd Helicopter Squadron, Flight Regiment 2.

Wiener Neustadt Air Base
Wiener Neustadt Air Base was located northwest of the city and was one of the first airports on the European continent. It opened in 1910 and housed units of the Austro-Hungarian Imperial and Royal Aviation Troops. The base was close to the Wiener Neustädter Flugzeugwerke (WNF) factory in the eastern part of the city and which manufactured Messerschmitt Bf 109s and repaired Junkers bombers and destroyers during World War II.  The base was bombed to total destruction during World War II and was rebuilt by the Soviets who operated the base until 1955. The Austrian military took the base over, but didn't use it until 1961. The base houses no units, but Flight Regiment 1's  are operating from the base for flight training purposes as well as for training of army parachutists.

Truppenübungsplatz Allentsteig – Liechtenstein Kaserne

Frundsberg Kaserne
The Frundsberg Kaserne in the southern suburbs of Schwaz east of Innsbruck houses a detachment of Flight Regiment 2's AS-316B Alouette IIIs used for SAR and firefighting duties. The helicopters are operating from Schwaz since 1969. The base is earmarked for closure, with the helicopters being redeployed to the nearby Andreas Hofer Kaserne.

Air Defense Facilities

Radar installations sites for mobile air defense systems are also maintained by the Austrian Air Force.

Ortsfeste Radarstation Kolomannsberg – ORS K
This radar site is located atop the Kolomannsberg (1,114 m) on the border between Salzburg and Upper Austria north of Thalgau in a region known as the Flachgau. The site is active since January 1968, and provides 24/7 air surveillance since August 1968. Initially a French CSF (now Thales Group) RV376 and a British Marconi (now BAE Systems) S244 height finder were used at the site but were replaced by an Italian Selenia (now Alenia) RAT-31S 3D-radar in 1983. The system was further enhanced with the installation of a Selenia (now Alenia) RAT-31DL 3-D radar in 2003.

The site is also called  (lit. large space radar station) since it has the necessary office and working areas for a complete air traffic/combat control center. It served in this role until 1987 when its tasks were taken over by the EZ/B and is still maintained to provide backup when needed.

Ortsfeste Radarstation Speikkogel – ORS SPK
This radar site is located atop the Speikkogel (2,140 m) on the border between Styria and Carinthia in the Koralpe mountains west of Wolfsberg. The site is active since 1986, with its construction and commission severely hampered by the bad weather in the region (partly due to the height above SL) and problems with the radom and the radar itself. A Selenia (now Alenia) RAT-31S 3-D radar is installed, scheduled to receive the RAT-31DL upgrade. The site features a downsized version of the ORS K's control center, but is normally not manned.

Ortsfeste Radarstation Steinmandl – ORS STM
This radar site is located atop the Steinmandl (490 m) north of Ernstbrunn in the Leiser Berge region 40 km north of Vienna. The site is active since 1985; to the immediate west a secondary radar operated by AustroControl is located atop the Buschberg. The ORS uses a Selenia (now Alenia) RAT-31S 3-D radar, but is scheduled to receive the RAT-31DL upgrade. The site was a replacement for the unbuilt one atop the Schneeberg south of Vienna.

Current inventory

Modernization and expansion of the Austrian jet fleet

Modernization and expansion of the Eurofighter fleet 
In 2022, the Austrian Ministry of Defense announced that the entire Eurofighter fleet would be modernized. The currently 15 Eurofighters are to receive night vision, self-defence and medium-range missiles.

Furthermore, the purchase of further fighter jets is currently being examined.

Subsonic jets with light armament 
It is very likely that Austria will announce the purchase of light jets with light armament (e.g. on-board cannon, unguided rockets,...) in the first half of 2023. More detailed information regarding the type is not yet known.

Retired 
A list of some notable aircraft retired from the Air Force service

Air Defense Systems

Mobile MRCS-403 Systems

As a backup to the fixed sites and to create a better situation image in times of crisis two Selenia (now Alenia) MRCS-403 3-D radars – mobile versions of the RAT-31S – are operated by the  since 1979. Several sites (Irrsberg, Hochwechsel) are prepared to host the radar.

Mobile RAC 3D Systems
To provide detection of low-flying aircraft the  operates six Thomson-CSF (now Thales Group) RAC 3D medium-range 3-D radars – designated TER  – mounted on ÖAF 32.403 trucks beginning in 1998. A further 16 of these systems are operated by the Air Defense Bataillons in special target designation configuration to provide early warning and target tracking for the Mistral units.

35 mm Twin-barreled Anti-Air Gun Model 85

The Z/FlAK 85 (/) is the Oerlikon Contraves GDF-001 system. 18 of these guns were purchased in 1965 (under the designation Z/FlAK 65) and used with earlier acquired Oerlikon Contraves FLGer 60 (fire control radar) Super Fledermaus and new Oerlikon Contraves FLGer 65 Improved Super Fledermaus.

A second batch of these guns consisting of a further 18 Z/FlAK 65, but this time with FLGer 69, a further improved Super Fledermaus, was purchased in 1973. The FLGer 69 were never issued to the units but returned to the manufacturer in 1973 for eventual replacement with the new FLGer 75 Skyguard beginning in 1976. Improved Skyguards, dubbed FLGer 79 were purchased in 1981.

The guns itself were upgraded to GDF-005 standard in 1987, designated Z/FlAK 85 since. The FLGer 75/79 have been upgraded to FLGer 98 in the late 90s. A total of 72 guns and 37 Skyguard systems have been acquired over the years.

Light Anti-Air Guided Missile Mistral
The lFAL Matra (now MBDA) Mistral is not only used with the Air Defense Regiments of the Air Force, but also with the air defense batteries attached to the HQ units of the Army's Brigades.
72 of these systems – along with several hundred missiles, the exact number is unknown – have been purchased beginning in 1993. They are used in conjunction with the so-called ZZR, 16 Thomson-CSF (now Thales Group) RAC 3D medium range 3-D radars in target designation configuration which were purchased in 1998. Nine missile launchers and two radars normally operate in a battery.

Other Air Defence Systems
 20 mm Light Anti-Air Gun Model 65/68, Oerlikon Contraves GAI-B01, retired
 25 mm Anti-Air Gun Model 38/39, Model Hotchkiss, retired 1959
 40 mm Anti-Air Gun Model 55/57, Model Bofors, retired late 70s

References

External links

 "Airpower" Austrian Military Aviation Journal
 Austrian Air Force Database with Pictures on Doppeladler.com
 Geheimprojekte.at Airbase History
 Austrian Air Force at Scramble
 Austrian Aircraft at BHI
 Austrian Air Surveillance at ACIG

Military units and formations established in 1955
 
1955 establishments in Austria